Second League of FR Yugoslavia 2000–01 (Serbian: Druga liga Jugoslavije) consisted of three groups of 18 teams (Serbia) and 1 group of 12 teams (Montenegro).

League table

North

East

West

South (Montenegro)

Yugoslav Second League seasons
Yugo
2000–01 in Yugoslav football